Post Bank of Iran (Pest Bank Iran) is an Iranian bank.

History
Post Bank of Iran was formally established in 2006. It is the eleventh state owned bank in Iran.

International issues
On 6 September 2013, the European General Court in Luxembourg ruled to annul the European Union (EU) sanctions in place since 2010 against the bank on grounds of supporting the Iranian nuclear and missile programs, as EU governments had not proved the accusations against the bank. As of 2016, the EU asset freeze was still in effect.

See also

Banking and insurance in Iran
Privatization in Iran

References

External links
 http://investing.businessweek.com/research/stocks/private/snapshot.asp?privcapId=35559725

Banks of Iran
Banks established in 2006
Iranian companies established in 2006
Postal savings system
Postal system of Iran